Android Auto is a mobile app developed by Google to mirror features of an Android device, such as a smartphone, on a car's dashboard information and entertainment head unit.

Once an Android device is paired with the car's head unit, the system can mirror some apps on the vehicle's display. Supported apps include GPS mapping and navigation, music playback, SMS, telephone, and Web search. The system supports both touchscreen and button-controlled head units. Hands-free operation through voice commands is available and recommended to reduce driver distraction.

Android Auto is part of the Open Automotive Alliance, a joint effort of 28 automobile manufacturers, with Nvidia as tech supplier, available in 36 countries.

Functionality
Android Auto is software that can be utilized from an Android mobile device, acting as a master to a vehicle's dashboard head unit. Once the user's Android device is connected to the vehicle, the head unit will serve as an external display for the Android device, presenting supported software in a car-specific user interface provided by the Android Auto app. In Android Auto's first iterations, the device was required to be connected via USB to the car.

For some time, starting in November 2016, Google added the option to run Android Auto as a regular app on an Android device, which allowed the choice to use Android Auto simply on a personal phone or tablet, as opposed to on a compatible automotive head-unit. This app was decommissioned in June 2022 in favor of a Driving Mode built into the Google Assistant app.

Availability
, Android Auto is available in 46 countries:

History
Android Auto was revealed at Google I/O 2014. The app was released to the public on March 19, 2015. In November 2016, Google implemented an app that would run the Android Auto UI on the mobile device. In July 2019, Android Auto received its first major UI rework, which among other changes, brought an app drawer to Android Auto for the first time. Google also announced that the app's ability to be used on a phone would be discontinued in favor of Google Assistant's drive mode.

In December 2020, Google announced the expansion of Android Auto to 36 additional countries in Europe, Indonesia, and more. In April 2021, Android Auto launched in Belgium, Denmark, Netherlands, Norway, Portugal, and Sweden. Google announced in May 2022 a user interface redesign for Android Auto, codenamed CoolWalk, which aims to simplify the app's usage, and make it more adaptable to screens of different orientations and aspect ratios. The redesign incorporates a new split-screen layout, where Google Maps can be displayed alongside a music player. CoolWalk was originally slated to launch in Q3 2022. In June 2022, Android Auto no longer ran directly on a mobile device; the app permitting this was decommissioned, in favor of a Driving Mode built into the Google Assistant app for a similar purpose. In November 2022, the CoolWalk user interface was released in Android Auto's beta program.

App support
An Android Auto SDK has been released, allowing third parties to modify their apps to work with Android Auto; initially, only APIs for music and messaging apps are available.

At CES 2018, Google confirmed that the Google Assistant would be coming to Android Auto later in the year.

Currently supported apps include Google Maps and Waze, popular music players such as Google Play Music, YouTube Music, Amazon Music, Apple Music and Spotify; and messaging apps, including WhatsApp, Facebook Messenger, Discord, Google Hangouts, Skype and Telegram.

Head unit support

In May 2015, Hyundai became the first manufacturer to offer Android Auto support, making it first available in the 2015 Hyundai Sonata. Automobile manufacturers that will offer Android Auto support in their cars include Abarth, Acura, Alfa Romeo, Aston Martin, Audi, Bentley, Buick, BMW, Cadillac, Chevrolet, Chrysler, Citroën,  Dodge, Ferrari, Fiat, Ford, GMC, Genesis, Holden, Honda, Hyundai, Infiniti, Jaguar Land Rover, Jeep, Kia, Lamborghini, Lexus, Lincoln, Mahindra and Mahindra, Maserati, Maybach, Mazda, Mercedes-Benz, Mitsubishi, Nissan, Opel, Peugeot, Porsche, RAM, Renault, SEAT, Škoda, SsangYong, Subaru, Suzuki, Tata Motors Cars, Toyota, Volkswagen and Volvo.

Additionally, aftermarket car-audio systems supporting Android Auto add the technology into host vehicles, including Pioneer, Kenwood, Panasonic, and Sony.

Criticism 
In May 2019, Italy filed an antitrust complaint targeting Android Auto, citing that a Google policy of only allowing third-party media and messaging apps on the platform prevented Enel from offering an app for locating vehicle charging stations.

Initially, Google did not enable third parties to integrate their mapping apps with Android Auto, only its own apps, Google Maps and Waze, being available. But since 2020, third party mapping apps such as Sygic are also available. 

Google announced a new SDK to be released to select partners in August 2020 and to be generally available by the end of 2020.

See also
 CarPlay
 Entune
 MirrorLink

References

External links

 
 Android Auto app at the Play Store
 Apps for Android Auto at the Play Store

2015 software
Android (operating system)
Dashboard head units
Google software
Natural language processing software
Virtual assistants